The 2022 Scotties BC Women's Curling Championship, the provincial women's curling championship for British Columbia, was held from January 5 to 9 at the Kamloops Curling Club in Kamloops, British Columbia. The winning Mary-Anne Arsenault team represented British Columbia at the 2022 Scotties Tournament of Hearts in Thunder Bay, Ontario, and finished with a 3–5 record. The event was held in conjunction with the 2022 BC Men's Curling Championship, the provincial men's curling championship.

The event was originally intended to be played at the McArthur Island Event Centre, but was moved behind closed-doors to the Kamloops Curling Club due to COVID-19 precautions.

Teams
The teams are listed as follows:

Knockout brackets

Source:

A event

B event

C event

Knockout results
All draw times listed in Pacific Time (UTC−08:00).

Draw 3
Wednesday, January 5, 9:00 am

Draw 4
Wednesday, January 5, 2:00 pm

Draw 5
Wednesday, January 5, 7:00 pm

Draw 6
Thursday, January 6, 9:00 am

Draw 8
Thursday, January 6, 7:00 pm

Draw 9
Friday, January 7, 9:00 am

Draw 10
Friday, January 7, 2:00 pm

Playoffs

A vs. B
Friday, January 7, 7:00 pm

C1 vs. C2
Friday, January 7, 7:00 pm

Semifinal
Saturday, January 8, 2:00 pm

Final
Sunday, January 9, 9:00 am

References

2022 in British Columbia
Curling in British Columbia
2022 Scotties Tournament of Hearts
January 2022 sports events in Canada
Sport in Kamloops